

Men's Single

Key
PFQ = Promoted From Qualifiers
PFR = Promoted From Reserves

Seeds

  Ville Lang (PFQ)
  Gao Huan (PFQ)
  Suppanyu Avihingsanon (PFQ)
  Chan Yan Kit (PFQ)

Qualifying draw

First qualifier

Second qualifier

Third qualifier

Fourth qualifier

Women's Single

Seeds

  Kirsty Gilmour (Not Qualified)
  Karin Schnaase (Not Qualified)
  Victoria Na (Not Qualified)
  Tatjana Bibik (Not Qualified)

Qualifying draw

First qualifier

Second qualifier

Third qualifier

Fourth qualifier

Men's doubles

Seeds

  Robert Blair/ Tan Bin Shen (Qualified)
  Kang Ji-wook/Lee Sang-joon (Qualified)
  Cho Gun-woo/Kim Dae-eun (Qualified)
  Chan Peng Soon/Ong Jian Guo (Not Qualified)

Qualifying draw

First qualifier

Second qualifier

Third qualifier

Fourth qualifier

Women's doubles

Key

PFQ = Promoted From Qualifiers
PFR = Promoted From Reserves

Seeds

  Chieh Hung-shih/Chien Wu-fang (PFQ)
  Chae Yoo-jung/Yang Ran-Sun (Qualified)

Qualifying draw

Second qualifier

Third qualifier

Fourth qualifier

Mixed doubles

Seeds

  Praveen Jordan/Vita Marissa (Qualified)
  Tan Wee Kiong/Woon Khe Wei (Not Qualified)
  Hirokatsu Hashimoto/Miyuki Maeda (Qualified)
  Kim Dae-eun/Ko A-ra (Qualified)

Qualifying draw

First qualifier

Second qualifier

Third qualifier

Fourth qualifier

External links 
Draws

Korea Open (badminton)
Korea Open Qualification
Korea Open Qualification
Sport in Seoul